Ushnyug is a rural locality (a selo) in Arkitsky Selsoviet, Tabasaransky District, Republic of Dagestan, Russia. The population was 270 as of 2010.

Geography 
Ushnyug is located 9 km southeast of Khuchni (the district's administrative centre) by road. Firgil, Tsukhdyg and Dzhugdil are the nearest rural localities.

References 

Rural localities in Tabasaransky District